The Canon EOS 550D is an 18.0 megapixel digital single-lens reflex camera, announced by Canon on 8 February 2010. It was available since 24 February 2010 and to US dealers from early March. It is known as the EOS Kiss X4 in Japan, and as the EOS Rebel T2i in the Americas. It is part of Canon's entry/mid-level digital SLR camera series, and was the successor model to the EOS 500D. It was succeeded by the EOS 600D (Kiss X5/Rebel T3i), but remained in Canon's lineup until being discontinued in June 2012 with the announcement of the EOS 650D (Kiss X6i/Rebel T4i).

Features
 18.0 effective megapixel CMOS sensor
 1080p HD video recording at 24p (23.976 fps), 25p (25 fps), and 30p (29.97 fps) with drop frame timing
 720p HD video recording at 50fps (50 Hz) and 60fps (59.94 Hz)
 480p video recording at 50p (50 Hz) and 60p (59.94 Hz)
 3.5mm microphone jack for external microphones or recorders.
 PAL/NTSC video output
 DIGIC 4 image processor
 14-bit analog to digital signal conversion
  3:2 aspect ratio LCD monitor
 Live view mode
 Built-in flash
 Wide, selectable, nine-point AF with centre cross-type sensor extra sensitive at f/2.8
 Four metering modes, using 63-zones: spot, partial, center-weighted average, and evaluative metering.
 Highlight tone priority
 EOS integrated cleaning system
 Internal monaural microphone
 sRGB and Adobe RGB colour spaces
 ISO 100–6,400 expandable to 12,800
 Continuous drive up to 3.7 frame/s (34 images (JPEG), 6 images (raw))
 SD, SDHC, and SDXC memory card file storage
 Raw and large JPEG simultaneous recording
 USB 2.0, HDMI control (CEC)
 LP-E8 battery
Approximate weight  with battery and card

Bundled software
The 550D comes with following image processing and camera operating software: ZoomBrowser EX / ImageBrowser Image Processing, Digital Photo Professional, PhotoStitch, EOS Utility and Picture Style Editor.

Optional accessories
The Canon 550D has available accessories such as:
 All EF and EF-S Lenses
 Macro Ring Lite MR-14EX
 Macro twin lite MT-24EX
 E-series Dioptic Adjustment Lenses
 Angle Finder C
 Semi hard case EH19L
 Interface Cable IFC-200U/500U                      
 Original Data Security Kit OSK-E3
 Canon EX-series Speedlites & ST-E2       
 AC Adapter Kit (AC Adapter CA-PS700 & DC Coupler – DR-E8)
 Battery grip BG-E8                              
 Battery Magazine BGME8A/L                                                      
 Eyepiece Extender EPEX15II
 HDMI Cable HTC-100
 Remote Switch RS-60E3
 Wireless Remote Controller RC-6

Firmware updates
In July 2010, Canon released firmware 1.0.8 that fixed a phenomenon in which the set aperture moves unexpectedly when shooting movies in manual exposure mode using some Canon lenses (such as macro lenses). On 25 December 2010, Canon offered firmware version 1.0.9 which fixed tone jumps in some images, depending on the shooting scene and when shooting with the Auto Lighting Optimizer settings (low/standard/strong).

Custom firmware
Magic Lantern is an open source (GPL) firmware add-on for Canon DSLR cameras, which has enhancements for video and still photography without replacing the stock firmware. The Canon T2i is compatible with Magic Lantern firmware.

Reception
The British Journal of Photography was impressed by the 550D and said "the EOS 550D is a good match for the 7D at half the price". On Digital Photography Review, it got overall score of 77%. For most of its product life, alternative cameras included the Nikon D5000, Nikon D3100, Canon 500D, Nikon D90, and Pentax K-7. Immediately before it was discontinued in 2012, the main competitors of the 550D were the Nikon D3200 and D5100 (respectively the replacements for the D3100 and D5000), Pentax K-r (replacement for the K-x), and the Sony Alpha 57, one of the company's SLT cameras. (The replacement for the Nikon D90, the D7000, is positioned upmarket from the 550D.)

See also
 Canon EF lens mount

References

External links
 
 Product Page

550D
Live-preview digital cameras
Cameras introduced in 2010